Corsi may refer to:

Corsi people, an ancient people of Corsica and Sardinia
Corsi (statistic), an advanced statistic in ice hockey
Corsi (surname), includes a list of people with the name